Al-Nahar is a Canadian exempt Category B Arabic language specialty channel.

Al-Nahar is a general interest television network from Egypt. Programming includes talk shows, political discussions, dramas, movies, mini-series, game shows and reality series.

History

Al-Nahar was launched on June 30, 2011 by the Egyptian businessman Alaa El Kahky. The first channel of the network is a main channel sharing the same name, but since 2016, it was renamed to Al-Nahar One, only to be renamed back to just Al-Nahar by 2017. The second channel of the network, Al-Nahar Drama, was launched on August 1, 2011, and broadcasts popular Arabic television series. The third channel of the network, Al-Nahar Ryada, was launched on December 8, 2011, and broadcast sports-related TV shows, but since 2016, it was closed, and its programs were merged with Al-Nahar Al-Youm. The fourth channel of the network, Al-Nahar Movies, was launched in May 2012, and broadcast foreign films, but since 2013, it was closed. The fifth channel of the network, Al-Nahar +2, was launched on July 20, 2012, and broadcast TV shows from the original Al-Nahar TV channel after two hours, but was later closed, only to be relaunched as Al-Nahar One +2 until it was closed again. During Ramadan 2017, it was relaunched again until it was closed again after the end of the holy month of Ramadan in 2017. The sixth channel of the network, Al-Nahar Drama +2, broadcast popular Arabic television series that were also broadcast by the original Al-Nahar Drama channel after two hours, but was later closed, only to be relaunched during Ramadan 2017 until it was closed again after the end of the holy month of Ramadan in 2017. The seventh channel of the network, Al-Nahar Al-Youm, was launched in May 2014, and broadcast news-related TV shows, but since 2016, it was closed. The eighth channel of the network, Al-Nahar Noor, was launched in 2015, and broadcast religious TV shows, but by July 2017, it was closed. The ninth channel of the network, Al-Nahar Cinema, was launched on February 1, 2016, and broadcast popular Arabic movies. The tenth channel of the network, Al-Nahar Enty, involved women's affairs.

The Canadian version of the channel originally launched as Orbit Al Yawm but was subsequently re-branded as Al-Nahar TV in July 2015.

See also
Television in Egypt

References

External links
 Official website 
 YouTube channel
 Ethnic Channels Group page

2011 establishments in Egypt
Television stations in Egypt
Digital cable television networks in Canada
Egyptian diaspora
Television channels and stations established in 2011
2010s in Egyptian television
Arabic-language television stations
Arabic-language television in Canada
Egyptian-Canadian culture